Mipus boucheti is a species of sea snail, a marine gastropod mollusk in the family Muricidae, the murex snails or rock snails.

Description
The length of the shell attains 13 mm.

Distribution
This marine species occurs off Vanuatu.

References

boucheti
Gastropods described in 2008